Thatcher (also Thacher) is an unincorporated community. It is located in Cherry County, Nebraska, United States.

History
Thatcher had a post office from 1884 until 1889. The community was named for James M. Thatcher of Fort Niobrara.

References

Populated places in Cherry County, Nebraska
Unincorporated communities in Nebraska